Bukhty is a rural locality (a selo) in Gunibsky District, Republic of Dagestan, Russia. The population was 994 as of 2010.

Geography 
Bukhty is located 30 km south of Gunib (the district's administrative centre) by road. Shangoda and Shitli are the nearest rural localities.

References 

Rural localities in Gunibsky District